This article details the Huddersfield Giants rugby league football club's 2014 season. This is the 19th season of the Super League era and the Huddersfield Giants 12th since promotion back to the top flight in 2003. The Huddersfield Giants came into the season as defending League Leaders' Shield winners, finishing top of the Super League the previous year – their first 1st-place finish in 81 years. Huddersfield Giants hoped to have a play-off place for the sixth consecutive season and a first Super League Grand Final appearance.

Squad
* Announced on 14 November 2013:

Table

Results

Pre-Season Friendlies

First Utility Super League

Player appearances
Super League Only

 = Injured

 = Suspended

Tetley's Challenge Cup

Player appearances
Super League Only

2014 squad statistics

 Appearances and points include (Super League, Challenge Cup and Play-offs) as of 29 May 2014.

 = Injured
 = Suspended

Transfers

Ins

Outs

References

External links
Huddersfield on Sky Sports
Huddersfield on Super League Site
BBC Sport-Rugby League

Huddersfield Giants seasons
Huddersfield Giants